Dendropsophus oliveirai is a species of frog in the family Hylidae.
It is endemic to Brazil.
Its natural habitats are subtropical or tropical dry forests, dry savanna, freshwater marshes, and intermittent freshwater marshes.
It is threatened by habitat loss.

References

oliveirai
Endemic fauna of Brazil
Amphibians described in 1963
Taxonomy articles created by Polbot